Zhang Ye (born 9 February 1989) is a Chinese former footballer.

Career statistics

Club

Notes

References

1989 births
Living people
Chinese footballers
Association football forwards
Singapore Premier League players
Hebei F.C. players